David Mundy (born 20 July 1985) is a former Australian rules footballer who played for the Fremantle Football Club in the Australian Football League (AFL). He played as a half back flanker or midfielder and was the captain of Fremantle during the 2016 AFL season. Mundy sits eighth in the VFL/AFL games records for most games played.

Early career 
Mundy began his football career at the Murray Bushrangers in the TAC Cup. He was drafted by Fremantle at selection 19 in the 2003 AFL Draft.   This selection was traded to Fremantle by the Western Bulldogs in return for Steven Koops.  Upon moving to Western Australia in 2004 he was allocated to the Subiaco Football Club in the West Australian Football League (WAFL). He spent the entire 2004 season playing with Subiaco and was a part of their premiership team.

AFL Career 

Impressive WAFL form continued into 2005 and he was selected by Fremantle to make his AFL debut at the MCG against Melbourne in Round 6.  His poise and composure in defence saw Mundy maintain his position in the side for all 17 remaining games for the season.  In round 14 he was recognised by the AFL by being nominated for the AFL Rising Star award.  In the final voting, he came 3rd behind Brett Deledio and Ryan Griffen with 15 votes.  He also was awarded the 2005 Beacon Award as the best young talent on the Fremantle list.

Mundy started the 2008 season in good form, and was shifted to a midfield role late in the season in order to use his kicking ability.  In 2009, he played his 100th game and was only the eighth player in league history to play them consecutively from debut. He played 124 consecutive games from his debut until he was a late withdrawal due to stomach cramps before the Round 17, 2010 match against the Western Bulldogs.

2010 was his best season to date, and he was recognised by being named in the 40-man squad for the 2010 All-Australian team and also won the Doig Medal as Fremantle's best player for the year. At the end of the 2010 season, there was much speculation that Mundy would not renew his contract with Fremantle and would instead either return to play in Melbourne, or be recruited by the new Gold Coast Football Club.  However, he rejected all other offers and re-signed with Fremantle in September 2010 for an additional four years. He then later re-signed at the end of 2014 for another 3 years.

Mundy received his first All Australian selection in 2015 named in the 2015 All-Australian team on the interchange bench. A highlight in 2015 was during the Round 17 clash with the Richmond Football Club at the MCG. In the final minutes of the game, a Richmond kick out after a Fremantle behind was marked by Garrick Ibbotson who passed to Mundy approximately 45 metres out from goal. Mundy kicked a goal with 40 seconds left, leading Fremantle to a 4-point victory. He would repeat a very similar play again against Richmond at the MCG in 2017, when he marked the ball 25m out from goal with 11 seconds remaining in the game. He kicked a goal after the siren leading Fremantle to win by just 2 points.

In 2016, he was named the captain of Fremantle, however, the team headed into one of their worst seasons to date, with only four wins that year. In 2017, the captaincy was passed to Nathan Fyfe. He extended his contract for a further year early in the 2017 season.

Mundy was the second Fremantle player to reach 300 games, after Matthew Pavlich. His 300th game was during Fremantle's 19 point win over the Western Bulldogs at Optus Stadium in round 6 2019. In early 2021, Mundy's longevity became the subject of discussion, as he was widely considered to be in career-best form despite his advanced age for an Australian rules footballer.

On 21 July 2021, Mundy signed a one-year deal to remain with the Fremantle for the 2022 season. Four days later, he made his 350th appearance in a match against the Sydney Swans.

On 1 August 2022, Mundy announced his intention to retire at the end of the 2022 season. Mundy's last game was during Fremantle's semi-final against Collingwood at the MCG. It is generally agreed that he should still be playing, leaving a huge hole in the heart of the club.

Statistics
 Statistics are correct to the end of round 19, 2022

|-  style="background-color: #EAEAEA"
! scope="row" style="text-align:center" | 2005
|style="text-align:center;"|
| 16 || 17 || 1 || 3 || 136 || 128 || 264 || 78 || 23 || 0.1 || 0.2 || 8.0 || 7.5 || 15.5 || 4.6 || 1.4 || 0
|-  
! scope="row" style="text-align:center" | 2006
|style="text-align:center;"|
| 16 || 25 || 1 || 5 || 253 || 165 || 418 || 141 || 44 || 0.0 || 0.2 || 10.1 || 6.6 || 16.7 || 5.6 || 1.8 || 0
|- style="background-color: #EAEAEA"
! scope="row" style="text-align:center" | 2007
|style="text-align:center;"|
| 16 || 22 || 10 || 2 || 218 || 135 || 353 || 123 || 49 || 0.4 || 0.1 || 9.9 || 6.1 || 16.0 || 5.6 || 2.2 || 0
|-  
! scope="row" style="text-align:center" | 2008
|style="text-align:center;"|
| 16 || 22 || 10 || 7 || 209 || 164 || 373 || 106 || 63 || 0.4 || 0.3 || 9.5 || 7.4 || 17.0 || 4.8 || 2.9 || 0
|- style="background-color: #EAEAEA"
! scope="row" style="text-align:center" | 2009
|style="text-align:center;"|
| 16 || 22 || 15 || 14 || 217 || 194 || 411 || 110 || 69 || 0.7 || 0.6 || 9.9 || 8.8 || 18.7 || 5.0 || 3.1 || 0
|-  
! scope="row" style="text-align:center" | 2010
|style="text-align:center;"|
| 16 || 22 || 12 || 8 || 244 || 263 || 507 || 80 || 105 || 0.6 || 0.4 || 11.1 || 12.0 || 23.0 || 3.6 || 4.8 || 9
|- style="background-color: #EAEAEA"
! scope="row" style="text-align:center" | 2011
|style="text-align:center;"|
| 16 || 12 || 7 || 5 || 137 || 148 || 285 || 44 || 68 || 0.6 || 0.4 || 11.4 || 12.3 || 23.8 || 3.7 || 5.7 || 1
|- 
! scope="row" style="text-align:center" | 2012
|style="text-align:center;"|
| 16 || 22 || 8 || 12 || 306 || 181 || 487 || 94 || 88 || 0.4 || 0.6 || 13.9 || 8.2 || 22.1 || 4.3 || 4.0 || 12
|- style="background-color: #EAEAEA"
! scope="row" style="text-align:center" | 2013
|style="text-align:center;"|
| 16 || 22 || 7 || 9 || 318 || 214 || 532 || 90 || 120 || 0.3 || 0.4 || 14.5 || 9.7 || 24.2 || 4.1 || 5.4 || 16
|- 
! scope="row" style="text-align:center" | 2014
|style="text-align:center;"|
| 16 || 24 || 11 || 12 || 342 || 246 || 588 || 87 || 109 || 0.5 || 0.5 || 14.2 || 10.2 || 24.5 || 3.6 || 4.5 || 13
|- style="background-color: #EAEAEA"
! scope="row" style="text-align:center" | 2015
|style="text-align:center;"|
| 16 || 23 || 10 || 4 || 301 || 317 || 618 || 94 || 119 || 0.4 || 0.2 || 13.1 || 13.8 || 26.9 || 4.1 || 5.2 || 19
|-
! scope="row" style="text-align:center" | 2016
|style="text-align:center;"|
| 16 || 18 || 5 || 2 || 223 || 203 || 426 || 58 || 83 || 0.3 || 0.1 || 12.4 || 11.3 || 23.7 || 3.2 || 4.6 || 2
|- style="background-color: #EAEAEA"
! scope="row" style="text-align:center" | 2017
|style="text-align:center;"|
| 16 || 21 || 13 || 9 || 215 || 233 || 448 || 80 || 87 || 0.6 || 0.4 || 10.2 || 11.1 || 21.3 || 3.8 || 4.1 || 5
|-
! scope="row" style="text-align:center" | 2018
|style="text-align:center;"|
| 16 || 22 || 19 || 13 || 249 || 245 || 494 || 97 || 91 || 0.9 || 0.6 || 11.3 || 11.1 || 22.5 || 4.4 || 4.1 || 8
|- style="background-color: #EAEAEA"
! scope="row" style="text-align:center" | 2019
|style="text-align:center;"|
| 16 || 22 || 8 || 7 || 230 || 272 || 502 || 60 || 86 || 0.4 || 0.3 || 10.5 || 12.4 || 22.8 || 2.7 || 3.9 || 8
|-
! scope="row" style="text-align:center" | 2020
|style="text-align:center;"|
| 16 || 16 || 4 || 1 || 131 || 159 || 290 || 33 || 59 || 0.3 || 0.1 || 8.2 || 9.9 || 18.1 || 2.1 || 3.7 || 3
|- style="background-color: #EAEAEA"
! scope="row" style="text-align:center" | 2021
|style="text-align:center;"|
| 16 || 22 || 15 || 7 || 248 || 305 || 553 || 68 || 87 || 0.7 || 0.3 || 11.3 || 13.9 || 25.1 || 3.1 || 4.0 || 20
|-
! scope="row" style="text-align:center" | 2022
|style="text-align:center;"|
| 16 || 16 || 3 || 6 || 146 || 197 || 343 || 41 || 60 || 0.2 || 0.4 || 9.1 || 12.3 || 21.4 || 2.6 || 3.8 || TBA
|- class="sortbottom"
! colspan=3| Career
! 370
! 159
! 126
! 4123
! 3769
! 7892
! 1484
! 1410
! 0.4
! 0.3
! 11.1
! 10.2
! 21.3
! 4.0
! 3.8
! 116
|}

References

External links

WAFL Player Profile

1985 births
Living people
Fremantle Football Club players
Subiaco Football Club players
Australian rules footballers from Victoria (Australia)
Murray Bushrangers players
Seymour Football Club players
Doig Medal winners
All-Australians (AFL)
Fremantle Football Club captains
Australia international rules football team players